Aethes floccosana is a species of moth of the family Tortricidae. It was described by Francis Walker in 1863. It is found in the United States, where it has been recorded from Illinois, Kentucky, Missouri, New Jersey, North Carolina, Ohio and Tennessee.

Adults have been recorded on wing from May to July.

References

floccosana
Moths described in 1863
Moths of North America
Taxa named by Francis Walker (entomologist)